This is a list of radio and television situation comedies produced by the BBC.

0–9 
 10:96
 2point4 Children
 4 O'Clock Club
 15 Storeys High
 500 Bus Stops

A

B

C

D

E

F

G

H

I

J 
 Jam & Jerusalem
 Joking Apart
 Josh
 Just Good Friends
 Justin's House

K 
 Keeping Mum
 Keeping Up Appearances
 Kiss Me Kate

L

M

N 
 Next of Kin
 No Place Like Home
 No Strings (1974 TV series)
 Not Going Out
 Not in Front of the Children

O

P 
 Peter Kay's Car Share
 Porridge
 Pramface
 A Prince Among Men
 People Just Do Nothing
 Pulling

Q 
 Quacks

R 
 Rab C. Nesbitt 
 Red Dwarf
 Rev
 Rings on Their Fingers
 The River (British TV series)
 Rosie
 The Royal Bodyguard
 The Royle Family

S

T

U 
 Up Pompeii!
 Upstart Crow
 Up the Women
 Uncle

V 
 The Vicar of Dibley
 The Visit
 The Vital Spark

W

Y 
 Yes Minister
 Yes, Prime Minister
 The Young Ones
 You Must Be the Husband
 You Rang, M'Lord?

Z 
 Zig and Zag

Further reading

See also
 List of Channel 4 television programmes

References

Sitcomes